Abel Juan Martínez Colón (born 3 June 1993) is a Cuban international football player, who currently plays for GCE Villaralbo in the Primera Regional of Castille and León.

Club career
Back in Cuba, he played for his native provincial team La Habana. 

In November 2020, Martínez signed for Spanish club GCE Villaralbo.

Doping case
Martinez was allowed by the Cuban FA to sign professional terms with Mexican side Cruz Azul Premier alongside compatriot Maykel Reyes in 2016, only to be suspended for two years by FIFA for use of the banned substance furosemide while on Olympic duty with Cuba in Canada in September 2015. Cruz Azul dismissed him subsequently, leaving him to work as a model while living with his girlfriend in Puebla.

International career
Martinez has played in the 2013 CONCACAF U-20 Championship, 2013 FIFA U-20 World Cup and the 2014 Central American and Caribbean Games tournament.

He made his senior international debut for Cuba in a January 2016 friendly match against Panama and has, as of January 2018, earned a total of 2 caps, scoring no goals.

References

External links
 

1993 births
Living people
Sportspeople from Havana
Association football central defenders
Cuban footballers
Cuba international footballers
Competitors at the 2014 Central American and Caribbean Games
Central American and Caribbean Games bronze medalists for Cuba
FC Ciudad de La Habana players
Cruz Azul footballers
Lynx F.C. players
Cuban expatriate footballers
Expatriate footballers in Mexico
Cuban expatriate sportspeople in Mexico
Doping cases in association football
Cuban male models
Central American and Caribbean Games medalists in football